is a railway station on the Minobu Line of Central Japan Railway Company (JR Central) located in the city of Fuji, Shizuoka Prefecture, Japan.

Lines
Iriyamase Station is served by the Minobu Line and is located 5.6 kilometers from the southern terminus of the line at Fuji Station.

Layout
Iriyamase Station consists of a single island platform connected to the station building by a footbridge. The station building is staffed.  A small park outside the station has a preserved D51 steam locomotive. A spur freight line leads to the nearby Oji Paper Company factory.

Platform

Adjacent stations

History
Iriyamase Station was opened on July 20, 1913, as one of the original Minobu Line stations for both passenger and freight services. It came under control of the Japanese Government Railways (JGR) on May 1, 1941. The JGR became the JNR (Japan National Railway) after World War II. Freight services were discontinued in 1972, the same year that the tracks from Fuji to Fujinomiya were expanded to a double track system. Along with the division and privatization of JNR on April 1, 1987, the station came under the control and operation of the Central Japan Railway Company.

Station numbering was introduced to the Minobu Line in March 2018; Iriyamase Station was assigned station number CC03.

Passenger statistics
In fiscal 2017, the station was used by an average of 925 passengers daily (boarding passengers only).

Surrounding area
Iriyamase Station is located in an industrial area with numerous paper mills and chemical plants.

See also
 List of railway stations in Japan

References

External links

   Minobu Line station information	

Railway stations in Shizuoka Prefecture
Railway stations in Japan opened in 1913
Minobu Line
Fuji, Shizuoka